Erik Marvin Cook (born July 5, 1987) is a former American football center. He was selected by the Washington Redskins in the seventh round of the 2010 NFL Draft. He played college football at the University of New Mexico.

Professional career

Washington Redskins

2010 Season
Cook was drafted by the Washington Redskins in the seventh round of the 2010 NFL Draft. He was released by the team on September 4, 2010 and was signed to the practice squad the next day. On December 11, 2010, Cook was promoted to the active 53-man roster to fill the roster spot created by the suspension of Albert Haynesworth.

2011 Season
In the 2011 season, Cook made his NFL debut in Week 6 against the Philadelphia Eagles subbing in as the left guard after Kory Lichtensteiger tore his ACL. In Week 7, Cook would have his first career start, but as center while starting center, Will Montgomery, played left guard. The reason for this being that coaches felt that Cook was a better center than guard.

2012 Season
Cook was released on August 31, 2012 for final cuts before the start of the 2012 season.

New York Jets
Cook was signed by the New York Jets on August 4, 2013. He was released on August 31, 2013.

Personal
His older brother is Ryan Cook, a second round 2006 NFL Draft pick who formerly played for the Dallas Cowboys.

References

External links
New Mexico Lobos bio
Washington Redskins bio

1987 births
Living people
American football centers
New Mexico Lobos football players
Washington Redskins players
New York Jets players
Players of American football from Albuquerque, New Mexico